West Cowick is a village in the East Riding of Yorkshire, England, situated approximately  south-east of Snaith. It is just to the south of the A1041 road and north of the M62 motorway. It was historically part of the West Riding of Yorkshire until 1974.

It forms part of the civil parish of Snaith and Cowick.

To the east of the village is the late 17th-century Grade I listed Cowick Hall the former seat of the Viscounts Downe which is now the headquarters of Croda International.

In the late 13th to early 16th centuries AD, West Cowick was one of the production sites of a type of Medieval ceramic known as Humber ware.

References

External links

Villages in the East Riding of Yorkshire